Raymond George "Ray" Flockton (14 March 1930 – 22 November 2011) was an Australian cricketer who played first-class cricket for New South Wales.

Flockton was a Sydney traffic policeman, who also played first-class cricket. He was an all-rounder.

Flockton played 35 first class cricket matches between 1951 and 1963 as an all rounder, with a highest score of 264 not out and best bowling figures of 4 wickets for 33 runs.

He was inadvertently caught up in a controversial incident, when Sid Barnes made way in the side for Flockton for a match at the Adelaide Oval. Barnes then acted as twelfth man, and appeared in a suit (rather than 'whites'), carrying unnecessary items such as cigars, iced towels, a mirror and comb, a radio and a clothes brush.

Flockton died in November 2011 at his home in Port Macquarie after a long battle with cancer.

See also
 List of New South Wales representative cricketers

References

1930 births
2011 deaths
Australian cricketers
New South Wales cricketers
Commonwealth XI cricketers
Cricketers from Sydney